Ruth Willis (born 6 March 1989) is a Scottish cricketer. In July 2018, she was named in Scotland's squad for the 2018 ICC Women's World Twenty20 Qualifier tournament. She made her Women's Twenty20 International (WT20I) for Scotland against Thailand in the World Twenty20 Qualifier on 10 July 2018.

In May 2019, she was named in Scotland's squad for the 2019 ICC Women's Qualifier Europe tournament in Spain. In August 2019, she was named in Scotland's squad for the 2019 ICC Women's World Twenty20 Qualifier tournament in Scotland.

References

External links
 

1989 births
Living people
Cricketers from Cheshire
Scottish women cricketers
Scotland women Twenty20 International cricketers
Sportspeople from Crewe